Collo is a district in Skikda Province, Algeria, on the western Mediterranean Sea coastline of the province, it is also one of the most densely populated districts of the province. It was named after its capital, Collo.

Municipalities
The district is further divided into 3 municipalities:
Collo
Béni Zid
bellendéraïa

Districts of Skikda Province